Pavel Vladimirovich Sitnikov (born 5 August 1998) is a Russian short track speed skater. He competed in the 2018 Winter Olympics.

References

External links
 

1998 births
Living people
Russian male short track speed skaters
Sportspeople from Omsk
Olympic short track speed skaters of Russia
Short track speed skaters at the 2018 Winter Olympics
Short track speed skaters at the 2022 Winter Olympics
Short track speed skaters at the 2016 Winter Youth Olympics